Saint-Honoré refers to various places named after Honoratus of Amiens (Saint Honoré):

Places

Canada
 Saint-Honoré, a municipality in the province of Quebec
 Saint-Honoré-de-Shenley, a municipality in the province of Quebec
 Saint-Honoré-de-Témiscouata, a municipality in the province of Quebec
 Saint-Honoré, Chaudière-Appalaches, Quebec, a former parish municipality in the Chaudière-Appalaches region of Quebec

France
Saint-Honoré is the name or part of the name of several communes in France:
 Saint-Honoré, Isère, in the Isère department
 Saint-Honoré, Seine-Maritime, in the Seine-Maritime department
 Saint-Honoré-les-Bains, in the Nièvre department
 Saint-Honoré, a former commune of the Finistère department, now part of Plogastel-Saint-Germain

In France, it is also the name of two roads in Paris:
 Rue Saint-Honoré, in the 1st arrondissement
 Rue du Faubourg Saint-Honoré, in the 8th arrondissement

See also 
 St. Honoré cake, also known as "Saint-Honoré"